Ironus is a genus of nematodes.

References 

Enoplia
Enoplea genera